This is a self-published list, dated to 2008, of all books and other works where Egyptologist Zahi Hawass has appeared as author or editor.

The list is in chronological order.

1980s

1990s

2000 to present

See also
 Zahi Hawass
 Egyptology

References

Further reading

External links
 Zahi Hawass' official website

Bibliographies by writer
Egyptology books
Science bibliographies